The Minister of State for Union Affairs is the head of the State Ministry in the Vice President's Office for Union Affairs of the Government of Tanzania.

List of Ministers
The following have served the ministry:
 Party

References

External links